Adelognathinae is a subfamily of the parasitoid wasp family Ichneumonidae.

Adelognathinae are idiobiont ectoparasitoids of Symphyta larvae.  Distribution is Holarctic. This subfamily contains only one genus: the type genus Adelognathus.

Footnotes

References
Kasparyan, D.R. 1990. Ichneumonidae. Subfamily Tryphoninae: Tribe Exenterini. Subfamily Adelognathinae (in Russian). Fauna of the USSR, Insecta Hymenoptera 3(2): 1–340.
Townes, H.K. (1944): A catalogue and reclassification of the Nearctic Ichneumonidae (Hymenoptera). Part I. Memoirs of the American Entomological Institute 11:1-477.

External links
Diagnostic characters

Ichneumonidae
Apocrita subfamilies